Bradley A. Smith (born 1958) is the Josiah H. Blackmore II/Shirley M. Nault Professor at Capital University Law School in Columbus, Ohio. He previously served as commissioner, vice chairman, and chairman of the Federal Election Commission (FEC) between 2000 and 2005. He is best known for his writing and activities on campaign finance regulation.

Academic career and influence
Smith received a B.A. from Kalamazoo College and a J.D. from Harvard Law School in 1990.  After briefly practicing law with the Columbus, Ohio-based law firm of Vorys, Sater, Seymour and Pease, Smith joined the faculty at Capital University Law School in Columbus in 1993.

In 1996 Smith published "Faulty Assumptions and Undemocratic Consequences of Campaign Finance Reform" in the Yale Law Journal. In "Faulty Assumptions", Smith set forth a case against campaign finance regulation, arguing that efforts to regulate money in politics had been based on a series of incorrect beliefs about the effects of money in politics, and that as a result reform efforts had failed to accomplish their objectives and had made many of the problems of money in politics worse. "Faulty Assumptions," and later articles by Smith, have been cited in numerous recent Supreme Court decisions striking down campaign finance laws on Constitutional grounds, including Citizens United v. Federal Election Commission. In 2010 The New York Times called Smith the "intellectual powerhouse" behind the movement to deregulate campaign finance.  The importance of "Faulty Assumptions" lay in its blending of existing political science research with legal and constitutional theory. Before "Faulty Assumptions", most legal scholarship on campaign finance had followed a narrative that assumed the corruptive and anti-egalitarian effects of large campaign contributions and spending, and had then focused on the creating a legal regime to control those effects and justify regulation against First Amendment claims recognized by the Supreme Court in Buckley v. Valeo. At the same time, these articles largely ignored a growing literature in political science based on empirical studies of campaign spending and regulatory regimes.  Smith's contribution was to bring these two arms of scholarship together, blending the growing body of empirical data to the constitutional and legal principles laid out elsewhere. The result was to challenge the very foundation of campaign finance reform in both politics and constitutional law. Smith's analysis forced proponents of reform to rethink many basic assumptions, or at least to justify them against his critique.

Smith followed "Faulty Assumptions" with a series of academic articles further developing and refining his approach, notably "Money Talks: Speech, Corruption, Equality and Campaign Finance", which appeared in the Georgetown Law Journal in 1997. "Money Talks" focuses on Constitutional principles of campaign finance regulation.

Smith also wrote Unfree Speech: The Folly of Campaign Finance Reform, a book published by Princeton University Press in 2001.  Opponents of regulation, such as conservative columnist George Will, who called it "the year's most important book on governance", praised the book, whilst supporters of regulation were generally critical, such as journalist Eliza Newlin Carney, who criticized it as "facile and boggling". Scholars, including the British political scientist Michael Pinto-Duschinsky, were generally complimentary.

Unfree Speech is regarded by academics as a significant work.  It appeared in paperback in 2003. It was the forerunner of a number of scholarly books in the early 2000s that were skeptical of campaign finance reform and its underlying assumptions, including "The Fallacy of Campaign Finance Reform" by John Samples, "Money, Power, and Elections" by Rodney Smith, Melvin Urofsky's "Money and Free Speech", and Raymond LaRaja's "Small Change: Money, Political Parties and Campaign Finance Reform".

FEC career
Smith became a recurring witness before congressional panels on election matters. He was nominated to a six-year term on the FEC on February 9, 2000, by then-President Bill Clinton, and confirmed to the post by the United States Senate. By this time, Smith was considered a leading expert on campaign finance in the United States, with his writings on campaign finance and election issues having appeared in academic publications in addition to the Yale Law Journal, including the University of Pennsylvania Law Review and the Harvard Journal of Legislation.  The Brennan Center for Justice, a harsh critic of Smith's work,  nevertheless recognized him as "the most sought after witness" to make the case for deregulation of campaign finance before congressional committees.

Because of his contrarian, deregulatory views on campaign finance, there was a strong objection to his nomination from reform advocates. The libertarian magazine Reason noted that virtually all reform advocates "agreed that he was the wrong person for the job". His nomination, however, received encouragement from supporters of campaign finance deregulation, such as the Cato Institute.

As commissioner and, later, chairman of the FEC, Smith remained controversial, particularly in 2004, when, as chairman, he bucked the Republican Party and refused to support new regulations of "527 groups", organizations largely unregulated by campaign finance laws, that were generally believed to favour Democratic presidential candidate John Kerry. Smith's tenure was otherwise marked by efforts to reform the FEC's enforcement proceedings to provide greater due process rights for respondents, and a staunch stand against expansion of the law. Smith also supported the creation of an administrative fines program and an alternative dispute resolution office at the FEC. As commissioner, he maintained an active speaking schedule and continued to criticize campaign finance laws. He resigned from the FEC in August 2005 to return to teaching, writing in his resignation letter to President Bush, "Political activity is more heavily regulated than at any time in our nation's history."

Post-FEC career
After leaving the FEC, Smith returned to teaching at Capital University and founded a non-profit organization, the Center for Competitive Politics to promote deregulation of campaign finance. In 2017 the center changed its name to the Institute for Free Speech. Smith served as a senior fellow at the Goldwater Institute, a member of the Board of Scholars at the Mackinac Center for Public Policy, and a member of the board of trustees of the Buckeye Institute. He also sat on the advisory board of the Institute for Law and Politics at the University of Minnesota Law School, and serves on the editorial advisory board of the Election Law Journal. In 2007–08, he was an adviser on the Constitution and the Courts for the presidential campaign of Mitt Romney.

"Unfree Speech" was cited in the Supreme Court's majority opinion in Citizens United v. Federal Election Commission, which held that corporations have a right to spend money in candidate elections. Smith's organization, the Center for Competitive Politics, was co-counsel for plaintiffs in SpeechNow.org v. Federal Election Commission, a 2010 Court of Appeals case that created Super PACs. In 2012 Commentary called him "the single most important voice in the fight to roll back restrictions on political speech." In May 2010 he was announced as one of four winners of the year's Bradley Prize, awarded annually by the conservative Lynde & Harry Bradley Foundation of Milwaukee, Wisconsin, "to innovative thinkers and practitioners whose achievements strengthen the legacy of the Bradley brothers."

References

External links
 

Living people
American libertarians
American political scientists
American political writers
American male non-fiction writers
Capital University Law School faculty
Harvard Law School alumni
Kalamazoo College alumni
1958 births
Members of the Federal Election Commission
Mackinac Center for Public Policy
Clinton administration personnel
George W. Bush administration personnel